Xylophagus decorus is a species of fly in the family Xylophagidae.

Distribution
Canada, United States.

References

Xylophagidae
Taxa named by Samuel Wendell Williston
Insects described in 1885
Diptera of North America